Telal Sana'a International Schools Yemen is a chain of Telal Sana'a International Schools  in Yemen. The system has its main campus in Sana'a, a branch in Aden, and a branch in Taiz. It also operates the Sanaa Kids Academi.

The Sana'a Main Campus has Kindergarten, Junior, and Senior levels.

References

External links

 Turkish International Schools Yemen

Educational institutions with year of establishment missing
International schools in Yemen
Turkish international schools
Sanaa
Aden
Taiz